Liverpool railway station may refer to:

Liverpool Central railway station in Liverpool, England
Liverpool Lime Street railway station in Liverpool, England
Liverpool railway station, Sydney, Australia
London Liverpool Street railway station in London, England